The Khajeh-Nouri —alternatively transliterated as Khajenouri, Khajenoori, Khwajahnuri, Xojanori, etc.— family is one of the most prominent aristocratic families in the contemporary history of Iran, emerging from the ancient imperial era. The family originated from the Baladeh area in Mazandaran, and held local power during the late Safavid, Afshari, and Zand dynasties. From the beginning of the Qajar period, the family entered politics through bureaucratic and military positions. The family was based in Tehran, where they served in the Qajar court. Throughout the Qajar and Pahlavi periods the Khajeh Nouri family held high political positions and strong relations with the dynasties. The name translates to "Lord of Light" in Persian.

The most famous figure was Mirza Aga Khan Nouri, who was the Prime Minister of Iran during the reign of king Naser al-Din Shah Qajar.

Khajeh Nouri's family had ties to many aristocratic families of the Qajar period and belonged to a group of the ruling class that was called the "Thousand Families" by opponents of the monarchy before the Islamic Revolution.

History 
The oldest known information about the Khajeh Noori family dates back to the late Safavid period. During the reign of Shah Abbas II, Noor belonged to the family and the elders ruled the area. The first known ancestor of the Nouri family is Haji Mohammad Akbar. After him, there is information about his two sons named Taherbig and Khajeh Abdal Bey. It is said that Khajeh Abdal Bey was the "ruler of Aghasi" during the reign of Shah Abbas II, the ruler of Behshahr and his brother Tahir Beg. Khajeh Abdel Bey had seven sons. His son, Mirza Aghababa, is the father of Mirza Assadollah, mirza Mohammadzaki and Mirza Nasrollah and the ancestor of the Nouri families of Tehran and Shiraz, and his fit son, Aghahadi is the ancestor of the Nouri family in Isfahan. Mirza Aghababa was the first member of the Khajeh Nouri family to take office in the Qajar dynasty.

Post-Revolution 
During the revolution and when many members of the family were executed by the regime, many permanently settled outside of Iran where the family already held assets in and where they were educated. They fled to Europe, London and the United States.

Notable family members

References 

Iranian families
People of Qajar Iran